Arthur Williams (born 18 June 1986) is a British television presenter and former Royal Marine. He uses a wheelchair as a result of a severe car accident.

Early life 
Arthur was brought up in Eckington, South Worcestershire and played rugby for Prince Henry's High School in Evesham. He also swam for Pershore. A runner from an early age, Arthur also took part in the Army Cadet National Athletics finals after winning the Midland 1,500m.

He became a Royal Marines Commando in 2004 after passing the rigorous training required and was awarded the King's Badge. Being posted to 42 Commando, Lima Company in Plymouth, Arthur spent 18 months as a general duties Marine before specialising in signals and joining 6 Assault Squadron on board HMS Albion.

In 2007 when returning to duty from leave in Pershore Arthur's car went off the road – an accident that severed his spinal cord and left him paralysed from the waist down. Arthur returned to the Marines but later left in 2009.

Television and media career 
Williams has featured on numerous television programmes as a presenter or guest, particularly for Channel 4. Arthur's media career began after he sent in a three-minute clip on wheelchair racing for the channel's search for disabled presenters for its coverage of the London 2012 Paralympic Games.

In 2013, he was selected by BAFTA for mentoring as a "breakthrough Brit". He continued working with Channel 4 and presented the Sochi 2014 Winter Olympics and Rio 2016 Summer Olympics. He has also presented documentaries on aviation and military history including WWI's Forgotten Heroes, D-Day As It Happened and The Plane That Saved Britain – a documentary that focused on his love of the unheralded World War II aeroplane, the de Havilland Mosquito.

Williams is currently at work on a new documentary for Channel 4 and has also teamed up with Clemency Green and Adam Buxton to front The Great Escapists, a show that highlights the best things to do at the weekend.

Charity work 
One of the original Band of Brothers after rehabilitating at Tedworth House in Wiltshire, Arthur became a patron for Help for Heroes. He also works with the aviation charity Aerobility.

Hobbies 
Arthur is a keen pilot, having taken up the hobby – a childhood dream of his – after leaving the Marines. He learnt to fly through the disabled flying charity Aerobility www.aerobility.com  He holds both a National and International Private Pilot's licence.

References

Further reading
 I may be disabled but I'm game for anything - Worcester News

External links 
 Arthur Williams - The Guardian
 
 Aerobility website

British television presenters
Wheelchair category Paralympic competitors
1986 births
Paralympic Games broadcasters
Living people
People with paraplegia
Television presenters with disabilities